The 1995 UAW-GM Quality 500 was the 28th stock car race of the 1995 NASCAR Winston Cup Series and the 36th iteration of the event. The race was held on Sunday, October 8, 1995, in Concord, North Carolina, at Charlotte Motor Speedway, a 1.5 miles (2.4 km) permanent quad-oval. The race took the scheduled 334 laps to complete. In the final laps of the race, Roush Racing driver Mark Martin would manage to chase down Richard Childress Racing driver Dale Earnhardt for the lead, passing Earnhardt with three to go to take his 18th career NASCAR Winston Cup Series victory and his fourth and final victory of the season. To fill out the top three, the aforementioned Earnhardt and Hendrick Motorsports driver Terry Labonte would finish second and third, respectively.

In the overall driver's championship points standings, Dale Earnhardt would manage to close the gap between points leader Jeff Gordon by 97 points, decreasing Gordon's lead to 205 points.

Background 

Charlotte Motor Speedway is a motorsports complex located in Concord, North Carolina, United States 13 miles from Charlotte, North Carolina. The complex features a 1.5 miles (2.4 km) quad oval track that hosts NASCAR racing including the prestigious Coca-Cola 600 on Memorial Day weekend and the NEXTEL All-Star Challenge, as well as the UAW-GM Quality 500. The speedway was built in 1959 by Bruton Smith and is considered the home track for NASCAR with many race teams located in the Charlotte area. The track is owned and operated by Speedway Motorsports Inc. (SMI) with Marcus G. Smith (son of Bruton Smith) as track president.

Entry list 

 (R) denotes rookie driver.

Qualifying 
Qualifying was split into two rounds. The first round was held on Friday, October 6, at 12:00 PM EST. Each driver would have one lap to set a time. During the first round, the top 25 drivers in the round would be guaranteed a starting spot in the race. If a driver was not able to guarantee a spot in the first round, they had the option to scrub their time from the first round and try and run a faster lap time in a second round qualifying run, held on Saturday, October 7, at 10:00 AM EST. As with the first round, each driver would have one lap to set a time. For this specific race, positions 26-38 would be decided on time, and depending on who needed it, a select amount of positions were given to cars who had not otherwise qualified but were high enough in owner's points; which was usually four. If needed, a past champion who did not qualify on either time or provisionals could use a champion's provisional, adding one more spot to the field.

Five drivers would fail to qualify.

Full qualifying results

Race results

References 

1995 NASCAR Winston Cup Series
NASCAR races at Charlotte Motor Speedway
October 1995 sports events in the United States
1995 in sports in North Carolina